Mavazekhan may refer to:
Mavazekhan-e Sharqi Rural District
Mavazekhan-e Shomali Rural District